Digitiser was a video games magazine that was broadcast on Teletext in the UK between 1993 and 2003. It originally billed itself as "The World's Only Daily Game Magazine".

The page was launched on 1 January 1993 on page 370 of the Teletext service on ITV before transferring over to Channel 4 later that year. It was updated daily except on Sundays, apart from a nine-month period in 2002 when it went to three days a week, weekends and holidays. 

It was followed by up to 1.5 million viewers at times. The magazine was notable for its surreal and risqué humour as well as its games coverage. Digitiser was advertised on the back of multiple issues of the multi-platform video game magazine Electric Brain.

Digitiser was created by writers Paul Rose and Tim Moore who went by the pseudonyms Mr Biffo and Mr Hairs. They wrote it together for the first four years while Rose wrote more or less solo for the remaining six in a freelance capacity.

History
Digitiser frequently courted controversy, inspiring criticism both from outside groups and Teletext's own editorial team, who viewed the writers as troublemakers but were unable to axe them due to the magazine's popularity. Pages were often altered without the writers' knowledge, with sub-editors sometimes deleting entire frames of reviews for fear of missing a risqué joke.

On one occasion, a sub-editor, who shortly afterwards was promoted to editorial director of the company, rang Rose to insist he remove a "disgusting" reference to "fingering the index". When Rose pointed out that it was a play on "index finger", and that it had not even dawned on him that it might be considered rude, the up-and-coming sub-editor is alleged to have fallen silent for a few seconds, before insisting that it was still deliberately provocative, and should be deleted. A similar confrontation occurred over a reference to "The three Rs", during which sub-editors believed that - despite Biffo's amused protests to the contrary - the "Rs" part of the phrase was meant to sound a bit like "arse", rather than a reference to the famous educational principle.

Campaigns were even waged to have Digitisers writing team fired - both within Teletext by its editorial minions, and beyond (by disgruntled Amiga, Sega, Sony, or Nintendo fans, not to mention the staff of Mean Machines and Official Nintendo magazines - whom Digitiser frequently poked fun at). Such reactions merely served to redouble Biffo's resolve to be controversial and edgy, and as he often wrote on the letters pages, Digitiser "hates everyone equally, man".

Digitiser became remarkably popular, despite (or in part due to) the sometimes risqué content, because of the novel reviews, format, and sometimes bizarre tone. Biffo's battles with his employers helped to give Digitiser a defiant, anti-establishment air.

Things finally came to a head in 2002, when Teletext gained a new senior editorial team, who lost patience with Biffo's pushing of the envelope of what was acceptable on a mainstream text service. Even though they could not quite bring themselves to get rid of Digitiser and Biffo altogether, they ordered that the magazine be reduced to three days a week, and have all humour and character stripped from the pages. Despite massive evidence to the contrary, and being one of the most popular features sections on Teletext, Biffo has said since that he was told the reason for this was because the humour "excluded people". Another reason for the reduction to three days a week, and the removal of the Panel 4 feature at weekends, was the negative financial effects felt after the  September 11 attacks on Teletext Ltd.'s core business of advertising air travel holidays.

It seemed as if the "suits" had finally won, and with Biffo's screenwriting career taking off at the time, he could have chosen to walk away from it all. However, he chose to stay on, writing the pages anonymously, as it only took 45 minutes out of his working day. "Money for old rope," he has said subsequently.

The decision later backfired on Teletext, when Digitisers viewing figures plummeted to 400,000 per day from its peak of 1.5 million, and viewers spent the next nine months inundating the company with letters of complaint, demanding that Digitiser's humour and characters be restored. After thousands of emails and letters had poured into Teletext they were forced to go back on their previous decision, and asked Biffo to reinstate the humour, and return Digitiser to its daily glory. However, for Biffo the damage had been done, and his last shreds of faith in the company had been shattered. After Biffo handed in his notice in December 2002, he returned Digitiser to its earlier style for one final, four-month run as a thank you to the fans - which included a special ten-year anniversary celebration, complete with a glowing eulogy by author Alex Garland. The lights finally went out on just over ten years of Digitiser on 9 March 2003.

Digitiser was replaced by GameCentral, which featured the same number of sub-pages, but none of the humour with then editor Tony Mott explaining  "We're not Digitiser so get over it" to readers on the first edition.

The writers
The founding writers of Digitiser were Mr Biffo (Paul Rose) and Mr Hairs (Tim Moore) who, as Biffo himself says, only began working on it in order to "amuse ourselves and get free games". Hairs was fired by Teletext in May 1996, and Biffo continued to write the bulk of the magazine solo, apart for occasional, part-time contributors, who helped him out with the letters, tips, and charts pages.

These temporary assistants went by the names Mr Cheese, Mr Udders and Mr Toast. Digitiser also ran a weekly opinion column, written by various guest writers, usually prominent members of the games journalist community (such as Violet Berlin and Stuart Campbell).

Recent news
In their 10 December 2006 episode, videoGaiden inducted Digitiser into their videoGaiden Time Capsule with the aid of Colin Baker in his outlandish Doctor Who outfit, and the song "Lavender" by Rose's favourite band, Marillion.

Regular characters
Regular characters appeared on the service both to fill up space left by short reviews and letters, and also to flesh out the content provided by the writers.The Man With a Long Chin (later renamed The Man) - The Man kept a regular diary in which he would detail the job he had been doing that week, before (usually) getting fired at the end of the week. One of The Man's jobs saw him working in a burger bar. He was eventually fired when he replaced the toilet paper with gloves from the lost property box, and someone froze to death in the toilet.The Man's Daddy (later renamed Daddy) - a bizarre ant/elephant creature who declared himself to be a famous comedian. His jokes tended to be disjointed, usually relying on a nonsense answer or a far-fetched pun. His jokes included: Question. Why did Superman wear his pants outside his trousers? Answer. Because he was a pervert., Question.: What do you call a dog wearing a policeman's hat? Answer: PC Dog-hat and Question.: What do you say if there is a seed in your pie and a man in your yard? Answer: "Seed pie leave now". 

Mr. T - A take on Mr. T from The A-Team, who would dispense worldly advice, while warning kids to stay away from his bins. His distinctive vocal style was brought across by the use of capitalisation of entire words in a sentence.

Phoning Honey - Would phone up stores in order to make prank calls, and present the transcript for readers' perusal.

Fat Sow - Presented the news page, and began every article with a wild insult, and a demand that the reader stop whatever they are doing to pay attention to the rant. Rose allegedly received a written warning when Teletext's editors deemed Fat Sow's comment "What's the matter lads - too fat and stupid to get into the army?" as "Grossly offensive towards security guards".

Zombie Dave - A reanimated corpse who appeared on the news page and punctuated the items with comments written in the manner of the shambling dead. This was frequently used as an excuse to get rude comments screened on the family-friendly service, such as when he described Tomb Raider's Lara Croft as a "thrr brrrd wrrz thrr tttrrrdz" kind of sound.

Insincere Dave - A send-up of fanboys, marketing staff and ultra-positive reviewers; in particular the over enthusiastic Dave Gibbons who at that time was the games reviewer for the BBC Ceefax service. Dave would comment briefly on the news items of the day in an overly optimistic and enthusiastic fashion. Famously, any spare space on the line his comments occupied would be filled with exclamation marks, further emphasising his "sincerity." Example: on a story about a pink casing accessory for the Dreamcast, Dave commented that, "Now your DC can be in the pink!!!!!!!". Very occasionally, a more deadpan Dave would appear: on a story regarding Microsoft's intention to ensure that the Xbox marketing budget outweighed Sony's PS2 expenditure, Dave remarked that, "Money is the most important thing." Dave's comments were usually preceded by a rather acid take on the day's gaming events, adding a further element of juxtaposition to Dave's enthusiasm.

The Snakes - A pair of beatboxing snakes, which would argue in a manner similar to that of Ali G (but pre-dating him by some years). Led to the catchphrase "I Cuss You Bad", along with the use of the word "Skank".

BW - A faceless quizmaster, who was a bizarre parody of Bamber Boozler, quizmaster of Teletext quiz Bamboozle, often appearing to be nude.

Gossi the Dog - Perhaps Digitisers most controversial character, Gossi hosted a regular gaming gossip page. On one occasion, the Broadcasting Standards Commission upheld a complaint about the Gossi page, which alluded to Gossi's master thrashing the talking cartoon dog with a belt. Gossi's page also led to the dismissal of Tim Moore, who - while Rose was away on paternity leave - printed an unsubstantiated rumour about a fellow games journalist Dave Perry.  Teletext's editors allegedly used the absence of Rose (who remained useful to the company for his graphic design abilities), and the journalist's complaint, as an excuse to fire Moore.

Doctor Derek Doctors - A sinister megalomaniac, whom Biffo and Hairs secretly removed from air, after a concerned mother rang to say she found him "Perverted and disgusting".

Chester Fisho - Chester gave views on the news of the day laced with masses of sexual innuendo.

Mock advertisements
During Teletext's 16-year run, many of its subpages would have adverts inserted on the last page. Digitiser decided to create their own spoof adverts as a result. One of the most notable was for a fictional German music compilation called Rock Meister!, which included stereotypical German words as in "Rock dir night mit ROCK MEISTER!!", instead of the official "Rock der nacht!" as the advertisement was poking fun of stereotypes made at the German language, alongside stating the compilation is "Musik fur dir LONGHAIRS!". Artists on the compilation were listed as Roxette (although they came from Sweden) and The Scorpions, while "NOT A REAL GERMAN ADVERT" was placed at the top left of the screen instead of the usual "NOT AN ADVERT". This was done as a viewer contacted Teletext over a previous spoof believing it to be real.

Reveal button
The reveal button was a feature that was made heavy use of on Digitiser. Pressing this key on your television remote made some previously hidden text appear, sometimes with a blinking effect. Typical jokes would tell you to press reveal to see what a certain character thought of your letter, or a news item, and you would be presented with a surreal non-sequitur, such as a man shouting "Swayze!" The weekend edition would often feature a full-length "story," told through "Reveal-O"s (as they were often called - see "Digi-Speak") on every page.

The most controversial "Reveal-O" appeared right at the end of Digitiser'''s life, on the final page of the final letters section. It purported to be a picture of "the real Turner The Worm (a cartoon character from Teletext also created by Rose) being sick". Pressing the reveal button then uncovered an image that many have likened to a recently ejaculated penis.

The end-of-year quiz featured lizard like creatures pointing to the correct answer with its tongue when the button was pressed.

Digi-Speak
A further element of Digitiser's other-worldly charm was its unusual take on the English language. Often this amounted to little more than using "the" in unusual places or adding curious suffixes to existing words (including, but not limited to -uss, -O, -ston, -Oh! and -me-do), but occasionally invented whole new sounds using words that never been used in that context, such as "huss" becoming an exclamation of joy.

Another very common Digitiser phrase was the expression "mess up". It was used to mean erring or failing, to rebuke or discredit a person's opinion ("You, sir, have messed up"), as an adjective meaning substandard or faulty ("messed-up animation"), and as a noun meaning any negative thing ("there are several mess-ups"). The phrase, like many others, was embraced by the readers who often used it in their letters. The author Alex Garland was a Digitiser fan and named a chapter in his novel The Beach "Messed Up" in its honour.

Using tramps as similes ("That's like putting lipstick on a dead tramp and calling it a supermodel"), the phrase moc-moc-a-moc and irrelevant sentences which read merely "And!" were all elements of the Digitiser lexicon.

It was common practice for Digitiser to mock the names of contributors to its letters page. Generally, the more obvious the better (for example a reader with the surname "Major" could well find themselves being referred to as "John"). Notable bits of name-calling included Digitiser viewer Matt Gander being rechristened "non-shiny goose", and a Mr. Tedesco being called "Safedeway", alluding to supermarket chains Tesco and Safeway.

Bubblegun.com
Bubblegun.com is a website that was established by Paul Rose, and featured contributions from several other writers. Touting itself as a Pop Culture version of Digitiser, this site gained popularity around the last few years of Digitiser, being named by Select magazine as one of the UK's top 10 "maverick websites". Though Paul Rose has not written for the site in over a decade, it remains as an archive run by its former designer, Steve Horsley. Though remaining unaffiliated with Rose - who has distanced himself from it - Bubblegun has featured new material from all-new contributors.

Digitiser 2000
In late 2014, Digitiser received an online revival of sorts with the launch of Digitiser2000.com, a website featuring a mixture of games news and reviews, articles and humour, in the traditional Digitiser offbeat style, and featuring many of the characters and features previously seen in the Teletext era of Digi. The content for the new site is largely written by Paul "Mr Biffo" Rose and was essentially self-funded at launch; Rose has since enabled a crowdfunding page through Patreon to enable readers to contribute towards the site's running costs (though the site's core content will remain freely available for all to view).

Mr Biffo's Found Footage
In 2017, Paul Rose successfully funded a Kickstarter campaign to bring together "Mr Biffo's Found Footage", a comedy/sci-fi montage series in the found footage style. The full series was released for free on YouTube weekly each Sunday, beginning on 10 September 2017 and ending on 22 October 2017.

Digitiser the Show
In 2018, a second Kickstarter campaign by Paul Rose was funded - over 1000 backers raised more than £44000 to create Digitiser the Show, a weekly six-part YouTube show featuring regular co-hosts Mr Biffo, Larry Bundy Jr, Octavius Kitten, Gameplay Jenny and Paul Gannon, and special guests from across the gaming community. Episodes also included appearances by various Teletext Digitiser characters in acted or puppet form, and the original Mr Hairs.

A third Kickstarter campaign by Rose for a second series, titled Digitiser the Show: Level 2, was also successful, with 980 backers pledging over £74000. The series will be hosted by Mr Biffo and Gannon, with appearances from Octavius and Bundy alongside other guests. The series is planned to be filmed throughout 2022 for release in early 2023 to coincide with Digitiser's 30th anniversary.

See alsoGameCentralPark Avenue''

References

External links
 Digitiser Vault

1993 in British television
Defunct magazines published in the United Kingdom
Magazines established in 1993
Magazines disestablished in 2003
Online magazines published in the United Kingdom
Teletext
Video game magazines published in the United Kingdom